Lee Ann Colacioppo, née Fleet, is an American journalist who in 2016 became the first female editor in chief of The Denver Post.

Biography 
Colacioppo is a graduate of Thomas Jefferson High School and Drake University in Des Moines, Iowa. Before joining The Post, she was an editor at The Des Moines Register. She worked for The Post for 17 years—city editor, investigations editor and news editor—before her elevation to the top editorship. She had a leading role in the newspaper's Pulitzer Prize-winning 2012 Aurora, Colorado shooting coverage; for that story, The Post won the 2013 Pulitzer Prize for Breaking News Reporting.

She succeeded Gregory L. Moore, The Post'''s top editor for 14 years, on May 30, 2016.

On June 28, 2016, Denver alternative newspaper Westword reported that The Post'' had newsroom layoffs after buyouts of 20 journalists failed to reach the newspaper's target of 26 job cuts in the newsroom.

References

External links 
 Lee Ann Colacioppo Twitter

Year of birth missing (living people)
Living people
American women journalists
Place of birth missing (living people)
Journalists from Colorado
Drake University alumni
21st-century American women